Vulcanism is an alternative spelling of volcanism.

Vulcanism may also refer to:
 Plutonism, a geologic theory

See also
Volcanology, the study of volcanic phenomena